The following state officials (not in order of precedence) are some of the most important in the Isle of Man. They take place in the annual Tynwald Day procession and have precedence or importance at other occasions.

 Lord of Mann
 Lieutenant Governor of the Isle of Man (representative of the Lord of Mann)
 Yn Lhaihder (The Reader)
 First Deemster and Clerk of the Rolls - Head of the Judiciary and Deputy Governor
 Second Deemster
 Deputy Deemster
 Attorney General
 High Bailiff
 Deputy High Bailiff
 President of Tynwald
 Speaker of the House of Keys
 Members of the House of Keys
 Clerk of Tynwald
 Chaplain of the House of Keys
 Members of Legislative Council
 Clerk of the Legislative Council
  Chief Minister
  Minister of Agriculture, Fisheries and Forestry
  Minister of Education
  Minister of Health and Social Security
  Minister of Home Affairs
  Minister of Local Government and the Environment
  Minister of Tourism and Leisure
  Minister of Trade and Industry
  Minister of Transport
  Minister of the Treasury
 Bishop of Sodor and Man
 Vicar General
 Archdeacon
 Tynwald Minister
 Senior Salvation Army Officer
 Ministers of the Free Churches
 Chair of the Isle of Man District of the Methodist Church
 Roman Catholic Dean
 Beneficed clergy
 Coroner of Glenfaba and Michael
 Coroner of Ayre and Garff
 Coroner of Middle
 Coroner of Rushen
 Chief Secretary
 Chief Registrar
 Chief Constable
 Deputy Chief Constable
 Mayor of Douglas
 Chairmen of the Town and Village Commissioners
 Captains of Parishes

Government of the Isle of Man